This list of black holes (and stars considered probable candidates) is organized by mass (including black holes of undetermined mass); some items in this list are galaxies or star clusters that are believed to be organized around a black hole. Messier and New General Catalogue designations are given where possible.

Supermassive black holes and candidates

 1ES 2344+514
 Ton 618 (this quasar has possibly the biggest black hole ever found, estimated at 66 billion solar masses)
 3C 371
 4C +37.11 (this radio galaxy is believed to have binary supermassive black holes)
 AP Lib
S5 0014+81 (said to be a compact hyperluminous quasar, estimated at 40 billion solar masses)
 APM 08279+5255 (contains one of the largest black holes, estimated at 10-23 billion solar masses; previous candidate for largest)
 Arp 220
 Centaurus A
 Fornax A
 HE0450-2958
 IC 1459
 Messier 31 (or the Andromeda Galaxy)
 Messier 32
 Messier 51 (or the Whirlpool Galaxy)
 Messier 60
 Messier 77
 Messier 81 (or Bode's Galaxy)
 Messier 84
 Messier 87 (or Virgo A)
 Messier 104 (or the Sombrero Galaxy)
 Messier 105
 Messier 106
 Mrk 421
 Mrk 501
 NGC 821
 NGC 1023
 NGC 1097
 NGC 1271
 NGC 1277
 NGC 1332
 NGC 1566
 NGC 2787
 NGC 3079
 NGC 3115
 NGC 3377
 NGC 3384
 NGC 3998
 NGC 4151
 NGC 4261
 NGC 4438
 NGC 4459
 NGC 4473
 NGC 4486B (a satellite galaxy of Messier 87)
 NGC 4564
 NGC 4579
 NGC 4596
 NGC 4697
 NGC 4889
 NGC 4945
 NGC 5033
 NGC 6251
 NGC 7052
 NGC 7314
 PKS 0521-365
 Q0906+6930 (a blazar organized around a supermassive black hole)
 RX J1131 (first black hole whose spin was directly measured)
 Sagittarius A*, which is in the center of the Milky Way

Types
 Quasar
 Supermassive black hole
 Hypercompact stellar system (hypothetical object organized around a supermassive black hole)

Intermediate-mass black holes and candidates
 Cigar Galaxy (Messier 82, NGC 3034)
 GCIRS 13E
 HLX-1
 M82 X-1
 Messier 15 (NGC 7078)
 Messier 110 (NGC 205)
 Sculptor Galaxy (NGC 253)
 Triangulum Galaxy (Messier 33, NGC 598)

Stellar black holes and candidates
 1E1740.7-2942 (Great Annihilator), 340 ly from Sgr A*
 4U 1543-475/IL Lupi
 A0620-00/V616 Mon (once thought to be the closest to Earth known, at about 3,000 light years)
CXOU J132527.6-430023 (a candidate stellar mass black hole outside of the Local Group)
 Cygnus X-1
 Cygnus X-3
 GRO J0422+32 (possibly the smallest black hole yet discovered)
 GRO J1655-40/V1033 Sco (at one time considered the smallest black hole known)
 GRS 1124-683/GU Mus
 GRS 1915+105/V1487 Aql
 GS 2000+25/QZ Vul
 GX 339-4/V821 Ara
 IGR J17091-3624 (candidate smallest known stellar black hole)
 LB-1 (name of both a galactic B-type star and a very closely associated over-massive stellar-mass black hole)
 M33 X-7 (most massive stellar-mass black hole known, not counting GW black holes)
 MOA-2011-BLG-191/OGLE-2011-BLG-0462 (first known isolated stellar black hole)
 SN 1997D (in NGC 1536)
 SS 433
 V404 Cyg
 V Puppis 
 XTE J1118+480/KV UMa
 XTE J1550-564/V381 Nor
 XTE J1650-500 (at one time considered the smallest black hole known)
 XTE J1819-254/V4641 Sgr

Black holes detected by gravitational wave signals

, 10 mergers of binary black holes have been observed.   In each case two black holes merged to a larger black hole. In addition, one neutron star merger has been observed (GW170817), forming a black hole.  In addition, over 30 alerts have been issued since April 2019, of black hole merger candidates.

Multiple black hole systems

Binary black holes
 EGSD2 J142033.66 525917.5 core black holes — galaxy hosting a dual AGN
 OJ 287 core black holes — a BL Lac object with a candidate binary supermassive black hole core system
 PG 1302-102 – the first binary-cored quasar — a pair of supermassive black holes at the core of this quasar
 SDSS J120136.02+300305.5 core black holes — a pair of supermassive black holes at the centre of this galaxy

In addition, the signal of several binary black holes merging into a single black hole and in so doing producing gravitational waves have been observed by the LIGO instrument.  These are listed above in the section Black holes detected by gravitational wave signals.

Trinary black holes
As of 2014, there are 5 triple black hole systems known.
 SDSS J150243.09+111557.3 (SDSS J1502+1115) core black holes — the three components are distant tertiary J1502P, and the close binary pair J1502S composed of J1502SE and J1502SW
 GOODS J123652.77+621354.7 core black holes of triple-clump galaxy
 2MASX J10270057+1749001 (SDSS J1027+1749) core black holes

See also
 Black hole
 List of nearest black holes
 Supermassive black hole
 Intermediate-mass black hole
 Stellar black hole
 Micro black hole
 Lists of astronomical objects

References

External links
 NASA's general description of black holes.
 A list of black hole stars and candidates compiled by Dr. William Robert Johnston, Ph.D (Physics), a post-doctoral researcher at the University of Texas (Dallas).

black holes, list of
Theory of relativity